Sakura Revolution is the first single released by Prits, a voice acting unit composed of Hisayo Mochizuki, Nana Mizuki, Natsuko Kuwatani, and Yumiko Kobayashi; all joined from the anime, Sister Princess. The first track, Sakura Revolution is also included in Dengeki G's Radio Complication Mini Album "G Raji Ongakubu" as well as its G's Mix version. In addition, Prits' sister unit Friends (under the same Starchild sub-label) released a rearranged version of Sakura Revolution.

Track listing

External links
  Official website > CD section (from the old ASCII Media Works archive)
  Amazon Japan

References

Sister Princess
Anime songs
2002 singles